Krke is a village in the municipality of Bratunac, Bosnia and Herzegovina.

History 

On 18 November 2011, it was announced that an exhumation was completed under the supervision of the Prosecutor's Office of Bosnia and Herzegovina. The exhumation team found the skeletal remains of one individual, a Bosnian Muslim believed to have been killed by Serbs in 1995.

References 

Populated places in Bratunac